The 2013 MBC Drama Awards is a ceremony honoring the outstanding achievement in television on the Munhwa Broadcasting Corporation (MBC) network for the year of 2013. It was held on December 30, 2013 and hosted by actor Lee Seung-gi and actress Han Ji-hye.

Nominations and winners
(Winners denoted in bold)

References

External links
 IMBC 

MBC Drama Awards
MBC Drama Awards
MBC Drama Awards
December 2013 events in South Korea